Dražice may refer to places:

Dražice, Croatia, a village in Croatia
Dražice (Tábor District), a municipality and village in the Czech Republic
Dražice, a village and part of Benátky nad Jizerou in the Czech Republic
Dražice, Rimavská Sobota District, a municipality and village in Slovakia

See also
Dražíč, a municipality and village in the Czech Republic
Darko Dražić, a Croatian footballer
Dražica, a settlement in Slovenia
Dražičky, a municipality and village in the Czech Republic